Cooku with Comali (Season 3) is the third season of the Tamil reality cooking TV show Cooku with Comali, that was launched on 22 January 2022. This season is hosted by Rakshan, and judged by Chef Damodharan and Chef Venkatesh Bhat.

The Grand Finale Telecasted on 24 July 2022, with Shrutika winning the title and Darshan emerging as the runner up of the show.

 Contestants (Cooks) 

 Comalis 

Manimegalai
Bala Jaganathan - Winner Comali
Sivaangi Krishnakumar
Sunita Gogoi
Mohamed Kuraishi
Sakthi Raj
Adhirchi Arun
Pugazh 
Mookuthi Murugan
Bharat K Rajesh 
Sheethal Clarin
Tiger Thangadurai
Sarath Raj

Weekly Summary

Statistics

Cook & Comali Pairings

Pairing Matrix

Special Guests 

Sheethal Clarin, Mookuthi Murugan, Sakthi Raj, Madurai Muthu, Sarath Raj and Pugazh are frequent guest comalis of the show

References

External links
Cooku With Comali on IMDb

Star Vijay original programming
2022 Tamil-language television seasons
Tamil-language television shows
Tamil-language game shows
Tamil-language reality television series
Television shows set in Tamil Nadu
Tamil-language cooking television series